K51GK was a low-power Class A television station in Sioux City, Iowa, United States, broadcasting locally in analog on UHF channel 51 as an affiliate of the Trinity Broadcast Network. Founded October 15, 1992, the station was acquired by Cornerstone Faith Center in 1997 and moved to channel 51 in 2004. The station's license was cancelled and its call sign deleted by the Federal Communications Commission on May 10, 2011.

K51GK's programming was the same national schedule as TBN, but deviated for taped repeats of their services, Mondays, Tuesdays and Thursdays at 11PM. Cable One did not offer the channel, but broadcast the taped service on their local Public-access television cable TV channel, Thursdays at 6:30PM. The church's other program, Breakaway was seen Sunday mornings on KTIV and Sundays at 12 Noon CT on Sky Angel's Angel One channel.

References

External links 
TBN official site
Cornerstone Faith Center official site

Religious television stations in the United States
Trinity Broadcasting Network affiliates
Television channels and stations established in 1992
Defunct television stations in the United States
Television channels and stations disestablished in 2011
1992 establishments in Iowa
2011 disestablishments in Iowa
Defunct mass media in Iowa